There are many creatures in the mythology, folklore, and fiction of many cultures who are one-eyed, this page lists such one-eyed creatures.

In mythology, folklore and religion
 Arimaspi, legendary people of northern Scythia, "always at war with their neighbours" and stealing gold from griffins. They had a single eye in the centre of the forehead.
 Balor, a giant in Irish mythology, with one eye in his forehead that would wreak destruction when opened
 Bungisngis, one-eyed giants of Philippine folklore
 Cyclopes (singular: Cyclops), one-eyed giants in Greek mythology, including Polyphemus. They had a single eye in the centre of their forehead.
 Polyphemus, a giant Cyclops shepherd in Greek mythology
 Arges, one of the three Cyclops smith gods in Greek mythology
 Brontes, one of the three Cyclops smith gods in Greek mythology
 Steropes, one of the three Cyclops smith gods in Greek mythology
 Dajjal, a figure in Islam akin to the Antichrist, who has one eye
 Duwa Sokhor, an ancestor of Genghis Khan, according to The Secret History of the Mongols, who had one eye in his forehead
 Fachan, a creature from Celtic mythology with one eye, one arm and one leg
 The Graeae, the three witches (or sisters) that shared one eye and one tooth between them; often depicted as clairvoyant. They were forced by Perseus, by stealing their eye, into revealing the location of Medusa.
 Hagen or Högni, a Burgundian warrior in German and Norse legend, depicted as one-eyed in some accounts
 Some yokais, in the Japanese folklore, have a single giant eye:
 Hitotsume-kozō, monsters (obake) in Japanese folklore, with a single giant eye in the center of the face
 Hitotsume-nyūdō could pass for really tall human priests if not for the large, single eye in the center of their faces.
 Kasa-obake, one-eyed sentient umbrella yokai of Japanese folklore
 Shirime
 Jian, a bird in Chinese mythology with only one eye and one wing. A pair of such birds were dependent on each other and inseparable.
 Kabandha, a demon with no head or neck with one large eye on the breast and a mouth on the stomach. Kabandha appears in Hindu mythology as a character in the Ramayana.
 Likho, an embodiment of evil fate and misfortune in Slavic mythology
 Mapinguari, giant sloth-like cryptid of Brazil and Bolivia often described as having one eye
 Odin, a Norse god (he was born with two eyes, but traded one for a drink from Mimir's well)
 Ojáncanu, one-eyed giant with a ten-fingered hand, a ten-toed foot, a long beard and red hair of Cantabrian mythology who embodies evil, cruelty and brutality
 One-Eye
One of three sisters in the Brothers Grimm fairy tale One-Eye, Two-Eyes, and Three-Eyes
A one-eyed giant in a story from a from Georgia, in the Caucasus, whose story parallels the story of Polyphemus (see Polyphemus#Possible origins)
 Papinijuwari, Australian sky deities with vampiric tendencies
 Popobawa, a Tanzanian shetani (evil spirit) that often takes the form of a one-eyed bat-like creature
 Psoglav, a one-eyed dog-headed monster in Serbian mythology
 Snallygaster, a one-eyed dragon-like creature said to inhabit the hills surrounding Washington, D.C. and Frederick County, Maryland
 Tepegoz, a one-eyed ogre in the Oghuz Turkish epic Book of Dede Korkut

In fiction

Science fiction
 Alpha Centauri, a green hermaphrodite hexapod with one huge eye; Doctor Who character first seen in The Curse of Peladon
 Cylon Centurions in sci-fi franchise Battlestar Galactica
The Cyclops (1957), a science fiction horror film about a creature created via radiation exposure
 Dalek Sec, a monster that became a one-eyed Dalek-human hybrid in Doctor Who
 Gigan from the Godzilla series, a one-eyed alien cyborg Kaiju
 Kerack, an alien race resembling large one-eyed prawns in the novel Camelot 30K
 Magnus the Red,the one-eyed primarch of the Thousand Sons legion Warhammer 40k
 Monoids, an alien race in the 1966 Doctor Who serial The Ark
 Myo and other Abyssin aliens in Star Wars
 Naga and his tribe of one-eyed violent mutants in the 1956 B-movie World Without End
 One-eyed, starfish-shaped aliens from the planet Paira in the 1956 Japanese film Warning from Space
 Ravage, a panther-like Decepticon in Transformers: Revenge of the Fallen
Scaroth, last of the Jagaroth, a time-travelling alien in the 1979 Doctor Who story City of Death
 Uniocs, an alien race in the webcomic Schlock Mercenary

Comic books

 Basilisk, a large one-eyed mutant in Marvel Comics' New X-Men
 Orb (comics), a Marvel Comics super-villain, primarily an adversary of Ghost Rider
 Shuma-Gorath, a giant eye with tentacles, in the Marvel comics universe
 Starro the Conqueror, a supervillain in DC Comics, a starfish-like creature who first appeared in 1960
 Shuma Gorath in Marvel Comics, first appearance in Marvel Premiere #10 September 1973
 Garagantos in Marvel Comics, first appearance in Sub-Mariner (1968–1974) issue #13

Historical and mythological fantasy

 Beholder, a creature in the role-playing game Dungeons and Dragons with one large eye and many smaller eyestalks
 Cyclops in the role-playing game Dungeons and Dragons
 Draken, a one-eyed sea monster in the animated series Jumanji
 Imbra, an idol and the highest god of Kafiristan in Rudyard Kipling's The Man Who Would Be King
 Medusa in the Italian film Perseus the Invincible, adapted for television as one episode of the series The Sons of Hercules
 Rell, a cyclops in the film Krull. The Cyclops traded with the Beast one of their eyes for the ability to see into the future. The Beast did give them the ability to see into the future – but they can only see the moment of their own deaths. 
 Sauron, the eponymous arch-villain of The Lord of the Rings, often depicted as looking through a single 'Eye' in Peter Jackson's cinematic adaptations of Tolkien's work
 Tyson, Percy Jackson's half-brother in Percy Jackson and the Olympians, is a Cyclops. Cyclopes also appear as villains.
 Zargon, a giant one-eyed monster in the role-playing game Dungeons & Dragons

Animation and puppetry

 Ahgg, the witches' giant spider with one eye in the center of his forehead in My Little Pony: The Movie
 Some of the characters in Ben 10
 Bill Cipher, an evil one-eyed yellow triangle in Gravity Falls
 Big Billy in The Powerpuff Girls who showed that he had one eye in the episode "School House Rocked"
 B.O.B. (Bicarbonate Ostylezene Benzoate), a gelatinous creature in Monsters vs. Aliens
 The Centaur Monster with a body of a centaur in TMNT (2007)
 Horvak, Krumm's father from Aaahh!!! Real Monsters
 Kang and Kodos, a recurring alien duo in the animated series The Simpsons
 Leela, a mutant character, as well as her parents Munda and Morris, in the animated series Futurama
 Some of the Minions, comic henchmen in the Despicable Me franchise
 Muno, a tall, red monster with one large eye, in the children's television series Yo Gabba Gabba!
 Sheldon Plankton in the animated children's series SpongeBob SquarePants
 Agent Pleakley in the 2002 animated film Lilo & Stitch
Sapphire in the Cartoon Network animated series Steven Universe
 Mike Wazowski, a round monster with one large eye on the breast and a mouth on the stomach. He appears in the 2001 animated film Monsters, Inc.
 Zatar the Alien, a green alien in the MTV series Celebrity Deathmatch
 Tri-Klops, a henchman of the villain Skeletor in the children's show He-Man and the Masters of the Universe
 Rob, an anthropomorph cyclop boy in the animated show The Amazing World of Gumball
 Kyle, the owner of the Queen's Goiter, and Cloppy, Evan's one-eyed monster doll from The Barbarian and the Troll

Anime and manga 
 Lord Boros, in One-Punch Man, the alien leader of the Dark Matter Thieves, self-proclaimed subjugator of the universe, and the first antagonist to give Saitama a "serious fight"
 Norman Burg, the butler and weapons specialist to Roger Smith in The Big O
 Darklops Zero, prototype of Darklops in the film Ultraman Zero: The Revenge of Belial
 Iwanaga Kotoko, in In/Spectre, A 17-year-old Goddess Of Wisdom to the spirits and humans alike, has only one eye and one leg due to sacrificing a part of her to become a goddess.
Manako, a cyclops sniper in Monster Musume
Hitomi Manaka, cyclops school nurse and protagonist of Nurse Hitomi's Monster Infirmary
Mannequin soldiers, lesser homunculi created by a government project in Fullmetal Alchemist

Video games
The beholster (a direct reference to the beholder from Dungeons and Dragons) in Enter the Gungeon
 Ahriman, a species of monster from the Japanese role-playing game series Final Fantasy
 The Cacodemon and Pain Elemental from id software's popular computer game DOOM
 The Cyclops and other various monsters in the popular Japanese role-playing game series Dragon Quest
 Dimitri Alexandre Blaiddyd from Fire Emblem: Three Houses
 Drethdock from the Sega Saturn game Battle Monsters
 The ghost Pokémon Duskull, Dusclops, and Dusknoir
 Eggplant Wizard, an enemy in Nintendo's Kid Icarus
 Evil Eye, a monster in the online RPG MapleStory
Fuyuhiko Kuzuryu, the ultimate yakuza from Danganronpa 2: Goodbye Despair.
 Gohma in The Legend of Zelda has only one eye. Gohma's appearance varies from game to game.
 Myukus a giant blue-green Alien with one eye in Rampage 2: Universal Tour
 Suezo, a one-eyed, one-footed breed of monster in the video game/anime series Monster Rancher
 Vaati and Bongo Bongo in the Legend of Zelda game series
 Waddle Doo in Nintendo's game franchise Kirby
 Zeke Von Genbu, Bringer of Chaos from Xenoblade Chronicles 2

Music
 Purple People Eater in the 1958 novelty song of the same name
 Sgt. Psyclopps, the one-eyed guitarist for the costumed comedy punk band The Radioactive Chicken Heads
 "Cyclops", a song from Portrait of an American Family by Marilyn Manson
 Wotan/Wandrer in The Ring of the Nibelung, a Germanic variant of Odin in Wagner's cycle of four music-dramas
 Black Shuck - a one-eyed demon dog in the song Black Shuck, by rock band The Darkness from their debut album Permission to Land.

Other
 Alastor "Mad-Eye" Moody, the Auror in the Harry Potter series by J. K. Rowling. He has one normally functioning eye, and one magical eye that can see through magical cloaking.
 The Wicked Witch of the West from L. Frank Baum's The Wonderful Wizard of Oz; also other queens and witches in Oz such as Blinkie (The Scarecrow of Oz) and Marcia (The Yellow Knight of Oz).
 Wenlock and Mandeville, London 2012 Olympic mascots
 The mythological one-eyed creatures have also been the subject of many derivative works and adaptions.

See also
 List of many-eyed creatures in mythology and fiction

References

 
 
One-eyed
Eye 1
One-eyed
Legendary creatures with absent body parts